Alexander Hamilton Bailey (August 14, 1817 – April 20, 1874) was an American politician, a United States representative and judge from New York.

Biography
Bailey was born in Barton le clay, 10 mins outside of Minisink, Orange County, New York on August 14, 1817. He graduated from Princeton College in 1837, where he studied law; was admitted to the bar and commenced practice of law.

Career
Bailey was examiner in chancery of Greene County from 1840 to 1842, and a Justice of the Peace of Catskill for four years. He was a member of the New York State Assembly (representing Greene County) in 1849, and Judge of Greene County Court from 1851 to 1855.
Bailey moved to Rome, New York in 1856 and continued his law practice. He was a member of the New York State Senate from 1862 to 1865, sitting in the 85th, 86th, 87th and 88th New York State Legislatures.

Elected as a Republican to the United States House of Representatives for the fortieth Congress, to fill the vacancy left by the resignation of Roscoe Conkling. He was re-elected to the forty-first Congress, holding office from November 30, 1867, to March 3, 1871. During that time, he was Chairman of the Committee on Expenditures in the Department of State.

Not a candidate for renomination in 1870, Bailey was elected judge of the Oneida County Court in 1871. He remained on the bench until his death.

Death
Bailey died in Rome, Oneida County, New York, on April 20, 1874 (age 56 years, 249 days). He is interred at Rome Cemetery, Rome, New York.

References

External links
 
 

1817 births
1874 deaths
Princeton University alumni
People from Minisink, New York
Republican Party New York (state) state senators
Republican Party members of the New York State Assembly
Politicians from Rome, New York
Republican Party members of the United States House of Representatives from New York (state)
19th-century American politicians